XRF may refer to:
 X-ray fluorescence, analytical technique
 X-ray flash (astronomy), celestial object